The 2015–16 SV Werder Bremen season is the 106th season in the club's football history. In 2015–16 the club plays in the Bundesliga, the top tier of German football league system. It is the clubs 33rd consecutive season in this league, having been promoted from the 2. Bundesliga in 1981.

The club also is taking part in the 2015–16 edition of the DFB-Pokal.

Season overview

August
On 8 August, Werder Bremen started the season by winning against third division side Würzburger Kickers. Werder lost the opening match of Bundesliga to Schalke 04 at home by a margin of 0–3. Werder earned their first point in Bundesliga after 1–1 draw away at Hertha BSC. Bremen earned their first win of the season by beating Borussia Mönchengladbach 2–1 at home with impressive performance from goal scorer Jannik Vestergaard and Aron Jóhannsson

September
After the international break, Werder continued their winning form by beating TSG Hoffenheim 3–1. The game appeared to be headed to a draw, but a two injury time goals from Anthony Ujah and Zlatko Junuzović in a matter of two minutes sealed the victory for Werder. However, Werder lost their way and winning form by losing to newly promoted team FC Ingolstadt and Darmstadt 98. Werder also saw Philipp Bargfrede and Fin Bartels getting marching orders against Ingolstadt and Darmstadt respectively. Aron Jóhannsson suffered a hip injury during training with no timeline given by Werder's medical staff on his return. Werder lost their third-straight match with a defeat to Bayer Leverkusen. Head coach Viktor Skrypnyk conceded that losing three match in a row was a big disappointment for the team.

October
Werder continued their losing trend by losing 1–0 to lowly-placed Hannover 96. This was the fourth consecutive loss for Werder, with unbeaten Bayern Munich looking to pounce on the team when they meet at Weserstadion after international break. Werder gave a fighting performance against league leaders Bayern and came close to securing a point through Anthony Ujah. Bremen, however, could not prevent Bayern from becoming the first-ever team to win nine opening matches Captain Clemens Fritz played his 250th match for Bremen but was not satisfied with the loss against Bayern after a spirited performance. Sporting Director Thomas Eichin, however, was at least pleased with the response of the team after having lost four-straight Bundesliga games. After losing five consecutive matches, The  Whites showed strength and character to outclass FSV Mainz 05 courtesy of an Ujah brace. The next match for Bremen was in DFB-Pokal, where they knocked off 1. FC Köln 1–0 to reach the last 16 of the competition. The month of October ended with a home match against second-placed Borussia Dortmund, which ended in 1–3 defeat. Sporting Director Eichin was happy with the spirited performance of Bremen and conceded that goal by Henrikh Mkhitaryan just before the half-time break changed the game in favour of Dortmund.

November
The  Whites started the month with a hard-fought 2–1 victory away at struggling FC Augsburg. The match will be remembered for Claudio Pizzaro's first goal of his third stint at Werder and his 177th Bundesliga goal, the highest-ever total by foreign player in the Bundesliga. In the next match, however, Werder faced their worst defeat of the season when they were thrashed 6–0 at the hands of VfL Wolfsburg. After the humiliating loss, Werder Bremen next faces their fiercest northern neighbour Hamburger SV for the 103rd time in the Bundesliga. Despite Werder historically tallying more wins (37) over their opponent (32), Hamburg appeared more up-beat about facing Werder after its impressive win over Borussia Dortmund the week prior. Werder lost the match 1–3, increasing the mounting pressure on coach Viktor Skripnik.

December
The month of December was received with positive news that forward Aron Jóhannsson, who has been out of action since October, has started  training sessions. The aim for Jóhannsson is to be in full training before the second half of the season begins after the winter break. On 6 December, Werder traveled to VfB Stuttgart and battled hard in the second half to rescue a point after Lukas Rupp put the hosts in front. Anthony Ujah scored the equaliser; his consistent goal-scoring performances have caught the attention of Stoke City for the upcoming winter transfer window. In Werder's next match, Ujah was again the centre of focus, missing a penalty in the next match against his former club, Köln. Werder were leading when Ujah missed the penalty, whereupon Köln compounded the misery for the Green Whites by leveling with a controversial goal. Werder are now without a win in their last six home games, and are desperate to win in their next match away at Borussia Mönchengladbach in the DFB-Pokal. The desperate Werder battled hard with courage and passion to come from behind to defeat Mönchengladbach 3–4 to earn a quarter-final spot in the DFB-Pokal. It was the night to remember for the Green-Whites, especially the young stars of Werder, such as Levin Öztunalı, Florian Grillitsch and Janek Sternberg, the latter who scored his first goal for Bremen. The DFB-Pokal win set up a quarter-final match away at Bayer Leverkusen, which will be played in the second week of February. Werder is set to face fellow Bundesliga strugglers Eintracht Frankfurt for the last game before the winter break commences. Head coach Viktor Skripnik is placing special importance to the match, terming it as "mini final" with players determined to give everything against Frankfurt. Werder ended 2015 with a loss against Frankfurt, thus ending the first half of the Bundesliga season in the relegation zone.

January 
The start of new year saw Werder Bremen sign 21-year-old Hungarian midfielder László Kleinheisler and Senegalese centre back Papy Djilobodji on loan from Chelsea until the end of the season. Meanwhile, long-serving Felix Kroos and Levent Ayçiçek has been loaned out to 1. FC Union Berlin and 1860 München respectively until the summer of 2016. The new year began with an impressive win for the Green Whites at Schalke 04, with captain Clemens Fritz leading from the front by scoring an equalizing goal and providing beautiful crosses for the next two goals. Unfortunately, Philipp Bargfrede suffered a meniscus tear in the game and will miss the remainder of the season. In the first home game of 2016, Werder played out a hard-earned draw against Hertha BSC. Despite going 2–0 down and later 3–1 down in the match, Werder fought valiantly to earn a 3–3 draw, with stunning goal by Fin Bartels and a superb header by Santiago García. Before the January transfer window closed, Bremen secured the services of midfielder Sambou Yatabaré from Olympiacos and centre back Miloš Veljković from Tottenham Hotspur.

February 
Bremen's next match was against Borussia Mönchengladbach, who were looking to end their losing streak. Bremen lost 5–1, pushing them down to the relegation play-off position in the table, whilst moving Gladbach up to sixth and pushing for a Champions League spot. It was disappointing team performance by the Green-Whites, despite striker Claudio Pizarro scoring a goal in his 400th game. Thomas Eichin was critical of the effort put by the players and stated his expectation for "100 percent" effort from his players. After the demoralising loss, Bremen returned to cup competition to face Bayer Leverkusen in the DFB-Pokal quarter-finals. Bremen continued its good fortune in the cup by coming from behind to beat Leverkusen 1–3 and secure their place in the semi-final against reigning Bundesliga champions Bayern Munich. On 13 February, Werder faced fellow league strugglers Hoffenheim at Weserstadion. Papy Djilobodji scored a crucial debut goal to earn a vital point for Werder, keeping them above Hoffenheim in the relegation battle. The game also saw a significant milestone when newly appointed Julian Nagelsmann of Hoffenheim became the youngest-ever Bundesliga coach at 28 years of age. On 20 February, Bremen suffered another defeat against newcomers FC Ingolstadt. The last match of the month saw Bremen hosting Darmstadt 98 for its 23rd league game. Eichin admitted that after the loss to Ingolstadt, the game against Darmstadt is like a must win encounter for Bremen. Bremen ultimately drew the match 2–2.

March
With mediocre performance in the previous month and with mounting pressure to avoid relegation, Werder Bremen started the month of March with impressive   display of goal scoring to earn two vital victories against Leverkusen and Hannover. It was an important landmark for veteran goal scorer Pizarro who scored hat-trick against Bayer Leverkusen to become the oldest bundesliga player to score a hat-trick. Pizarro was also on target against Hannover, which moved him within one goal away from the record goal-scorer Marco Bode's tally of 101 goals for Werder Bremen. The next match saw Werder receive pounding from current champion and league leader Bayern Munich and losing 5-0 at Allianz Areana. The last match of the month saw Werder Bremen coming from behind to secure a point against high flying Mainz

April
The  month of April saw Werder Bremens ambition to be in Bundesliga receive a massive dent as Werder lost consecutive matches to Borrusia Dortmund and struggling Augsburg. However, Werder Bremen resumed their Bundesliga survival by beating Wolfsburg 3-2 at Weserstadion. Claudio Pizarro scored from the spot and thereby became Bremen's all-time leading goal scorer with 102 goals. Weder Bremen next assignment was semi-final of DFB pokal against Bayern Munich, which Bremen eventually lost 2-0 ending their any hope of silverware to an otherwise disappointing season. The last match of the month, saw Werder facing its fierce neighbour Hamburg. The game ended in 2-1 loss for Werder despite a goal from Anthony Ujah.

May
Werder Bremen came out of relegation zone after an emphatic victory over fellow strugglers VfB Stuttgart. Fin Bartels scored a brace for the Green-Whites and revived the hopes of survival in the bundesliga next season. However, Bremen came down to the relegation zone after earning a draw against Cologne in the next match. The final match of 2015-16 Bundesliga sees Werder Bremen facing their closest rival Eintracht Frankfurt in the relegation battle to decide who is guaranteed a place in the Bundesliga next season. The final match ended in a dramatic fashion when Papy Djilobodji gave the Green-whites much needed goal in the 88th minute to ensure Werder Bremen continues to be in top-flight of German football.

Competitions

Bundesliga

League table

Results summary

Results by round

Matches

DFB-Pokal

Squad and statistics
Sources:

|}

References

SV Werder Bremen seasons
Werder Bremen